John Frederick Foster (born February 25, 1938) is a sailor from the US Virgin Islands. He competed at six Olympic Games, five in sailing at Summer Olympics from 1972 to 1992 (excluding 1980) and once in Bobsleigh at the 1988 Winter Olympics.

He competed with his son John Foster Jr. in the two-person keelboat at the 1984, 1988, and 1992 Olympics.

He was Commodore of the St Thomas Yacht Club in the Virgin Islands from 1967-1968.

See also
List of athletes with the most appearances at Olympic Games

References

External links
 
 
 

1938 births
Living people
United States Virgin Islands male sailors (sport)
United States Virgin Islands male bobsledders
American male sailors (sport)
Olympic sailors of the United States Virgin Islands
Sailors at the 1972 Summer Olympics – Tempest
Sailors at the 1976 Summer Olympics – Tempest
Sailors at the 1984 Summer Olympics – Star
Sailors at the 1988 Summer Olympics – Star
Sailors at the 1992 Summer Olympics – Star
Olympic bobsledders of the United States Virgin Islands
Bobsledders at the 1988 Winter Olympics
People from Saint Thomas, U.S. Virgin Islands